The Millennium Transmitter is a  tall mast owned by ABS-CBN Corporation and operated by Advanced Media Broadcasting System located at the ABS-CBN Broadcasting Center, Mother Ignacia Street corner Sgt. Esguerra Avenue, Barangay South Triangle, Quezon City. Since September 13, 2022, the transmitter is being used by AMBS to serve as the platform for television transmission of All TV on analog Channel 2 and digital Channel 16 (frequencies formerly used by ABS-CBN itself as its flagship station DWWX-TV and transmits from this tower before it ceased broadcast operations in 2020). It was also used as the main transmission site for ABS-CBN-owned DWAC-TV Channel 23, the flagship station of ABS-CBN Sports and Action, before shutting down in 2020 and its frequency reassigned to Aliw Broadcasting Corporation and its radio station DWRR until it was relocated to Antipolo when the transmitter was upgraded by the end of 1999.

History

The Millennium Transmitter, also known as the ABS-CBN Tower, and provisionally called as AMBS Tower, was constructed at the corner of Mother Ignacia Street and Sgt. Esguerra Avenue, within the ABS-CBN Broadcasting Center, at the time of its construction, it was one of the tallest lattice towers in the world. Construction began in the third quarter of 1968. On March 21, 1969, the tower became operational, transmitting television and radio for ABS-CBN and also used to beam color broadcasts in Metro Manila, and to nearby provinces. After martial law was declared on September 21, 1972, as ABS-CBN suspended their operations the following day, the facility was taken over by the crony-owned BBC-2 from 1973 to 1979; state-run People's Television's predecessors GTV/MBS-4 also occupied the tower from 1974 to 1992 to beam their programs. When the EDSA Revolution happened, both the tower and Broadcast Plaza were stormed by reformist rebels as escalating battle occurred on February 24, 1986. After the revolution, the tower was returned to ABS-CBN. Since then, the tower became the primary source of transmission for both DWWX-TV and DWRR and later it began transmitting the company's sister UHF station DWAC-TV in 1996. 
   

On June 30, 2020, the transmitter was shut-off due to a cease and desist order from the National Telecommunications Commission after ABS-CBN's legislative franchise expired on May 4, 2020.

After two years of being non-operational for transmission, ABS-CBN granted the request of AMBS to use the transmitter for the analog and digital broadcasts of ALLTV. This was confirmed by Willie Revillame on his show Wowowin.

Features

Tower
The tower uses dipole antennas with reflector, and UHF panel antennas for wide coverage of analog (VHF and UHF TV) and digital (ISDB-T) TV reception in Metro Manila some nearby provinces in both grades A and B, for the broadcasts of DWWX-TV and DWAC-TV respectively. Despite the name, the Millennium Transmitter is not a transmitter of its own, but rather a communications tower with antennas connected to multiple transmitters.

Transmitter facility
The transmitter facility housed both DWWX-TV and DWAC-TV that contained sets of transmitter equipment imported by Harris and Jampro of the United States.

Frequencies

Current

Analog television

Digital television

Former
All stations that were previously broadcasting from the Millennium Transmitter ceased transmission on May 5, 2020, following the expiration of its legislative franchise.

FM stations

Analog television

Digital television

See also
ABS-CBN
DWWX-TV
DWAC-TV
DWGT-TV
GMA Tower of Power
List of tallest buildings in the Philippines
List of famous transmission sites
Lattice tower

References

ABS-CBN Corporation
Buildings and structures in Quezon City
Broadcast transmitters
Assets owned by ABS-CBN Corporation
Towers completed in 1969
Transmitter sites in the Philippines
Advanced Media Broadcasting System